When the Dead Return is a one-reel 1911 American motion picture produced by Kalem Company and directed by Sidney Olcott with Gene Gauntier, Jack J. Clark and JP McGowan in the leading roles, and with Cinematography by George K. Hollister.

Cast
 Jack J. Clark as Antoine
 Gene Gauntier as Marcele
 JP McGowan as Jacques

References

External links

 When the Dead Return website dedicated to Sidney Olcott

1911 films
Silent American drama films
American silent short films
Films directed by Sidney Olcott
1911 short films
1911 drama films
American black-and-white films
1910s American films